On July 12, 1953, Transocean Air Lines Flight 512, a Douglas DC-6A operated by Transocean Air Lines  from Guam to Oakland, California, crashed into the Pacific Ocean roughly  east of Wake Island while en route to Honolulu for a planned stopover. All 58 passengers and crew on board were killed.

Crash
On July 12, Flight 512 was scheduled to fly from Guam to Oakland, California, stopping at Wake Island and Honolulu. The aircraft departed Guam at 00:04 GMT and arrived at Wake Island at 05:39 without incident. After boarding one additional passenger, Flight 512 departed at 06:58 for an estimated nine-hour flight. The aircraft radioed a 100-nautical-mile position report at 07:29, and another scheduled position report at 08:29. 

When Flight 512 missed its next scheduled position report, an alert was issued by Wake Island at 10:01. An incoming aircraft reported seeing a green flare en route from Honolulu at approximately 08:41. A preliminary accident notice was filed at 16:43. Within 24 hours, a complete listing of the aircraft's passenger and crew manifest was published in a California newspaper. The United States Navy dispatched 19 ships from Pearl Harbor, including the USS Epperson and USS Walker, along with 12 US Navy P2V Neptunes.  

Additional search support was summoned to the area. Eleven additional bodies were spotted but could not be recovered due to rough seas and the presence of sharks. The search was ended at 00:00 on 15 July 1953.

Investigation

Mechanical /structural failure

The fuselage was not recovered; therefore conclusions about mechanical or structural failure cannot be made. The aircraft had received regular maintenance and servicing, and there were no complaints of mechanical difficulty. Based on the recovered bodies and debris, there was no evidence of fire in flight and impact occurred with great force. Maintenance and inspection records were unremarkable.

Fuel loading

The Douglas DC-6A’s design provides for the storage of fuel in the wings of the aircraft. Precise sequences for fuel loading were established by the manufacturer so as not to exceed design limitations and place excess stress on the airframe. It was determined that the fuel was properly loaded in Guam.

Weather

Another commercial aircraft flying approximately 30 miles north of the scheduled route for Flight 512 reported “an extensive thunderstorm area accompanied by heavy turbulence was encountered.”  The weather briefing provided to Flight 512 prior to departure did not indicate any significant turbulence.

Sabotage

Sabotage was considered and ruled out.

Probable cause

Given the lack of physical evidence, The Civil Aeronautics Safety Bureau was unable to determine probable cause.

Notes

References

Bibliography

 (PDF)

Transocean Air Lines accidents and incidents
Airliner accidents and incidents with an unknown cause
Aviation accidents and incidents in 1953
Accidents and incidents involving the Douglas DC-6